Corsydd Llangloffan is a Site of Special Scientific Interest (or SSSI) in Pembrokeshire, South Wales. It has been designated as a Site of Special Scientific Interest since February 1992 in an attempt to protect its fragile biological elements.

Type
This site is designated due to its biological qualities. SSSIs in Wales have been notified for a total of 142 different animal species and 191 different plant species.

Corsydd Llangloffan SSSI is within the Cleddau Rivers Special Area of Conservation (cSAC) for otter, bullhead, river lamprey, brook lamprey, sea lamprey and water crowfoot. Breeding birds include barn owl, song thrush, spotted flycatcher, linnet, Eurasian bullfinch and reed bunting.

References

External links
Natural Resources Wales website

Sites of Special Scientific Interest in Pembrokeshire